Roommate is a South Korean reality show; formerly part of SBS's Good Sunday lineup. It was first scheduled to be aired on April 20, 2014, but due to the Sewol ferry tragedy and the temporary broadcast halt, the airing date was pushed to May 4, 2014. The show features eleven celebrities living together in a share house located in the Seongbuk-dong area of Seoul, sharing common spaces such as the kitchen, living room, and washrooms, as well as household tasks. The house features sixty cameras and five bedrooms.

Six of the original eleven roommates left the show ending the first season of Roommate on September 14, 2014. Seven new roommates were added for a brand new second season beginning September 21, 2014. With the return of K-pop Star to Good Sunday, Roommate moved to airing every Tuesday at 11:15 pm as a stand-alone program starting November 25, 2014. The second season was cancelled due to low ratings with the final episode airing on April 14, 2015. It was confirmed that there will be no season 3.

Season 1 
The original roommates were Lee So-ra, Park Bom and mixed martial artist Song Ga-yeon, Jo Se-ho and Lee Dong-wook, Nana and Hong Soo-hyun, Park Chan-yeol and Shin Sung-woo, and Park Min-woo and Seo Kang-joon. This mix of singers, actors/actresses, comedians, models, DJs and martial artists who have little reality and variety program experience is expected to create new undiscovered characters and laughter. On July 24, 2014, Baek Jung Ryeol of SBS announced that Park Bom had not participated in recordings since July 11, 2014, due to her amphetamine scandal and she officially left the program, with her final episode airing on July 27, 2014. On August 20, 2014, it was announced that Lee So-ra would leave the program due to schedule conflicts. On August 27, 2014, Song Ga-yeon was also confirmed to leave the show to focus on her career. On September 1, 2014, Shin Sung-woo announced on Twitter he would be leaving the show. On September 11, 2014, it was announced that Hong Soo-hyun would also be leaving to focus on her acting career. On September 12, 2014, it was announced that Park Chan-yeol would also be leaving the show due to his busy schedule. With more than half of the original members leaving the show, the producers announced a brand new season with new members alongside the remaining members of season 1.

Season 2 
A new season of Roommate was announced following the departure of several members. This season's concept is Home share, Whole share, where the members not only live together, but learn and share from each other. The new cast consisted of the remaining five roommates and seven new roommates. The new members featured a broad spectrum of the celebrities ranging from veteran stars to foreigners to rookie stars. The new roommates are Sunny, Park Joon-hyung, Jackson, Ryohei Otani, Lee Guk-joo, Bae Jong-ok, and Heo Young-ji. With the return of K-pop Star to Good Sunday, it was announced that Roommate would move to Tuesday nights airing at 11:15 pm replacing Magic Eye beginning November 25, 2014.
   
Roommate season 2 ended on April 14, 2015, after 26 episodes. Although preparations were being made for a new season, Roommate was confirmed to be cancelled due to low ratings; the last episode aired on April 14, 2015.

Cast

Season 1 members

Season 2 members

List of episodes

Season 1

Season 2

Guest appearances

Season 1

Season 2

Ratings 
In the ratings below, the highest rating for the show will in be red, and the lowest rating for the show will be in blue.

Ratings listed below are the individual corner ratings of Roommate. (Note: Individual corner ratings do not include commercial time, which regular ratings include.)

OST

Awards and nominations

References

External links 
Roommate official SBS website 

Seoul Broadcasting System original programming
2014 South Korean television series debuts
Korean-language television shows
South Korean variety television shows
South Korean reality television series